Kevin Venegas (born July 29, 1989) is an American soccer player.

Career

College and amateur
In 2010, while at Cal State Fullerton, Venegas put together a career year for the Titans starting in all 21 matches and finished with seven goals and three assists.  He finished his career at Fullerton with 74 appearances, 16 goals and 11 assists.

Venegas also spent the summer of 2010 with the Orange County Blue Star in the USL Premier Development League.

Professional

On January 17, 2012, Venegas was drafted in the second round (37th overall) of the 2012 MLS Supplemental Draft by Chivas USA. After failing to make the squad, Venegas joined Minnesota Stars FC of the North American Soccer League on April 3, 2012. Three weeks later, he made his debut in a 3–3 draw against the Atlanta Silverbacks. In 2012, he was named NASL Play Of The Year.

Venegas remained with Minnesota (now known as Minnesota United FC) as they moved up from NASL to Major League Soccer in 2017. He made six appearances for Minnesota that year, playing a full 90 minutes in each of them. After the season's conclusion, Minnesota dropped Venegas from their roster.

On January 25, 2018, United Soccer League side Indy Eleven announced that they had signed Venegas for the 2018 season. On June 14, Venegas scored his first goal and an assist for Indy Eleven in a 3–1 win over Toronto FC II. This performance earned him a spot on the USL Team of the Week for week 14.

On February 14, 2020, Detroit City FC announced they had signed Venegas for the 2020 season.

Career statistics

References

External links

 
 
 Cal State Fullerton bio
 

1989 births
Living people
American soccer players
Cal State Fullerton Titans men's soccer players
Chivas USA draft picks
Indy Eleven players
Major League Soccer players
Minnesota United FC (2010–2016) players
Minnesota United FC players
Detroit City FC players
North American Soccer League players
Orange County Blue Star players
People from Lakewood, California
People from Norwalk, California
Soccer players from California
Sportspeople from Los Angeles County, California
USL League Two players
National Independent Soccer Association players
Association football midfielders
Association football fullbacks